Dilan Ensemble is a Kurdish Music Ensemble from Iranian Kurdistan or Eastern Kurdistan (Kurdish:), which was established by the Kamanche player and composer Shahriyar Jamshidi in memoriam of Kurdish musician brothers Qadir Dilan and Muhamad Salih Dilan from Southern Kurdistan in 2003.

Backgrounds
Dilan Chamber Music ensemble's focus are to preserve the original Kurdish classical music and represent lyrical songs. The Kurdish folk songs and Maqam music from East part of Kurdistan were the major resources of their works at the beginning. The ensemble has accompanied a male singer and three choirs’ females on stage. Since 2007, duo to restriction of speech, tighten political situation and unpleasant circumstances in general for art workers in particular for Kurdish people in Iran, Dilan Ensemble have not been allowed to reassemble on stage again.

Performances
Dilan Ensemble with their full orchestra have performed several concerts in Tehran including Roudaki Hall and Arasbaran Cultural Centre (2004). They appeared as a trio on stage and have presented songs from different regions of Kurdistan in a distinctive dialect Kurmanji from North East of Iran, Khorasan at Mahak Hospital and Rehabilitation Complex (2007). In the upcoming years, Shahriyar jamshidi keeps Dilan Ensemble alive and active by collaborating with diverse musical artists by arranging multiple projects in Canada, US and Europe; Dilan Ensemble have performed at Festival du Monde Arabe de Montréal, Tirgan Festival, Mackenzie House, McMaster University and Small Word Music Centre in Ontario, Canada.

Discography
Alvanati (2004)
Call of the Mountains (2008)
A Yellow Flower (2014), it was contributed to the people of Kobanî.

Former members

References

Kurdish musical groups
World music groups
Persian classical music groups
Musical groups established in 2003